Brown v. Kendall, 60 Mass. 292 (1850), was a case credited as one of the first appearances of the reasonable person standard in United States tort law.

Factual background

Two dogs, belonging to the plaintiff and the defendant, respectively, were fighting and in the process of trying to break up the fight the defendant hit the plaintiff in the eye with a stick. In the trial court, the defendant requested that instructions be given to the jury about contributory negligence and a standard resembling the reasonable person standard, but the judge declined to give the instructions. The jury rendered a verdict for the plaintiff, and the defendant upheld.

Decision

The court reasoned that the defendant should only be liable if he was at fault. Fault should be determined by whether or not the defendant was acting with "ordinary care and prudence," a formulation of the reasonable person standard. The court determined that the lower court should have considered this standard when determining negligence and ordered a new trial.

References

United States tort case law
Negligence case law
1850 in United States case law
Massachusetts state case law
1850 in Massachusetts
Law articles needing an infobox